The 2021 CAF Women's Champions League Final was the final match of the 2021 CAF Women's Champions League, the first and inaugural edition of Africa's premier women's club football tournament organised by CAF. It was played at 30 June Stadium in Cairo, Egypt on 19 November 2021.

Mamelodi Sundowns defeated Hasaacas Ladies 2–0 to win the first ever CAF Women's Champions League title.

Teams

Venue
The final of the first CAF Women's Champions League was played as a single match at a pre-selected venue by CAF, similar to the format used in the men's competition. 30 June Stadium in Cairo, Egypt, home of Egyptian Premier League side Pyramids, was selected to host the final.

Road to the final

Match

Details 
The final match will helds after playing the Group stages and the semi-finals of the 2021 CAF Women's Champions League final tournament helds in Cairo.

Notes & references

Notes

References

External links
Opening the first CAF TotalEnergies Women's Champions League - cafonline.com

Final
November 2021 sports events in Africa
Sports competitions in Cairo
International club association football competitions hosted by Egypt